Charles Beatty may refer to:

 Charles Clinton Beatty (1800–1882), Presbyterian minister, seminary founder, and academic philanthropist
 Charles Eugene Beatty (1909–1998), American track and field athlete and educator

See also
Charles Beattie